Jirsara or Jir Sara may refer to:
 Jir Sara, Gilan